Caddo Mounds State Historic Site (41CE19) (also known as the George C. Davis Site) is an archaeological site in Weeping Mary, Texas. This Caddoan Mississippian culture site is composed of a village and ceremonial center that features two earthwork platform mounds and one burial mound. Located on an ancient Native American trail later named by the Spanish as El Camino Real de los Tejas, the settlement developed hundreds of years before the arrival of Europeans to the region. Archaeologists believe the site was created in approximately 800 CE, with most major construction taking place between 1100 and 1300 CE.

Operated by the Texas Historical Commission, the museum at the site was reopened in October 2015. The new museum offers visitors a chance to explore a replica Caddo village, and all exhibits are hands-on. Visitors can walk the  self-guided interpretive trail to see the Caddo burial, low temple, and ceremonial mounds. An additional trail along the El Camino Real is also available.

Description
  

The site began with the founding of a permanent village by the Hasinai, who moved into the region from the Red River area to the northeast, in roughly 850 to 900CE. The region had ideal qualities for a village: good soil, abundant food resources, and a permanent water source that flowed into the Neches River. What eventually became the largest mound, Mound A, was begun at this time. It is at the southern edge of the site and was surrounded by about 40 houses. Mound C, the northernmost mound of the three, was used as a burial mound, not for elite residences or temples like the other two. The site was the southwesternmost ceremonial mound center of all the great mound building cultures of North America.

The settlement was abandoned in the 13th century when the elite ruling class dissipated after the outlying hamlets became more self-sufficient and grew less dependent on the site for religious and political matters. The Caddo culture that remained was similar to the earlier culture in many ways but lacked much of its hierarchical structure and exotic material wealth. By the time Europeans arrived in the area in the 18th century, the Caddo groups in the area lived in small villages and hamlets, spread across the local landscape. They had long since stopped building mounds, and their former hierarchical social and political organization had become much less centralized.

The Hasinai groups continued to live in the Neches and Angelina River valleys up to the 1830s, but by the early 1840s, all Caddo groups had moved to the Brazos River area in an effort to avoid Anglo-American colonization. In 1855 the U.S. government moved them to the Brazos Indian Reservation. In 1859 it forced them to move again, to the Washita River in Indian Territory (now western Oklahoma). The Caddo still live in western Oklahoma, and Binger is the capital of the federally recognized Caddo Nation of Oklahoma.

Modern excavations
The earliest recorded mention of the mounds was in 1779 by Athanase de Mézières, who traveled from Louisiana to San Antonio in the employ of the Spanish government. In 1919 American James Edwin Pearce was the first professional archeologist to record the site for the Bureau of Ethnology (Smithsonian Institution). In 1933 archeologist E. B. Sayles concluded that the site was a Caddo mound center, after conducting surface collection of artifacts at the location.

The first scientific excavations were conducted from 1939 to 1941 by H. Perry Newell, a University of Texas archeologist with the federal Work Projects Administration in the government of President Franklin D. Roosevelt. When Newell died, archeologist Alex D. Krieger took over investigations at the site and concluded that it had been a major Caddo site. Further excavations in the 1960s and early 1970s by Dee Ann Story pinpointed the timeline of the site to 780 and 1260.

After acquiring seventy acres of the site, the Texas Parks and Wildlife Department established a historic park in 1974. It funded a series of excavations in the 1970s and 1980s. As a result of these excavations by the University of Texas at Austin, Texas A&M University, and private contractor Elton R. Prewitt, another twenty-three acres of land was added to the park in 1981. An interpretive visitors center was constructed at the site.  In 2008 the 80th Texas Legislature transferred operational control of the property to the Texas Historical Commission.

The museum and members of the Caddo Nation of Oklahoma have collaborated on activities that help the public understand Caddo culture. In July 2016, elder Phil Cross was interviewed about construction of a Caddo grass house at the site, with workers using traditional techniques.

2019 Tornado 
On April 13, 2019, during celebrations of Caddo Culture Day, an EF3 tornado struck the Mounds, killing one person and injuring 30–40, including 8 who were critically injured. Patients were transported to the hospital on a school bus or were life flighted.  The Mounds' visitor center and service buildings were heavily damaged, with a capital loss estimated at $2.5 million. The loss of the visitor center's museum-like display space destroyed many replica items, but actual artifacts had been withdrawn from public view long before by agreement between the Historical Commission and persons with standing in representation of the Caddo Confederacy of Native Americans.

See also

Battle Mound Site
Spiro Mounds
Caddo Nation of Oklahoma
List of museums in East Texas 
List of Mississippian sites
List of Texas State Historic Sites
National Register of Historic Places listings in Texas

References

External links

Caddo Mounds State Historic Site website
The Encyclopedia of Arkansas History and Culture (The Caddo Indians)
The Encyclopedia of Arkansas History and Culture (Indian Mounds)
A History of the Caddo Indians

Caddoan Mississippian culture
Mounds in the United States
Museums in Cherokee County, Texas
Native American history of Texas
Archaeological sites in Texas
Protected areas of Cherokee County, Texas
Caddo
Native American museums in Texas
Archaeological museums in Texas